The 1959 Miami Redskins football team was an American football team that represented Miami University in the Mid-American Conference (MAC) during the 1959 NCAA University Division football season. In its fourth season under head coach John Pont, Miami compiled a 5–4 record (3–2 against MAC opponents), finished in third place in the MAC, held five of nine opponents to seven or fewer points, and outscored all opponents by a combined total of 158 to 94.

James Daniels and Dave Girbert were the team captains.  Girbert led the team with 332 rushing yards. Other statistical leaders included Thomas Kilmurray with 454 passing yards and Howie Millisor with 132 receiving yards.

Schedule

References

Miami
Miami RedHawks football seasons
Miami Redskins football